Aleksandar Rašić (born March 16, 1984) is a Serbian former professional basketball player. He represented the Serbia national basketball team internationally.

Professional career
Rašić began his professional career during the 2003–04 season with Borac Čačak. He then moved to FMP Zeleznik.

In March 2007, he signed with the Turkish team Efes Pilsen, where he stayed for the rest of the season. In August 2007, he signed a two-year deal with the Russian team Dynamo Moscow. In November 2007 he was released by Dynamo. In November 2007, he signed with the German team ALBA Berlin for the remainder of the season. With them he won the Bundesliga. In July 2008, he returned to Serbia and signed with Partizan.

In September 2010, he signed with the Turkish team Trabzonspor. In March 2011, he moved to Lithuania and signed with Lietuvos rytas until the end of the 2011–12 season. In August 2012, he signed a one-year deal with the Italian powerhouse Montepaschi Siena. With them he won the Italian League and Cup. In October 2013, he moved to Turkey and signed a one-year deal with TED Ankara Kolejliler. In July 2014, he signed with another Turkish team Torku Konyaspor.

On September 2, 2015, he signed with the Romanian club Steaua București. On December 12, 2015, he left Steaua and signed with the Turkish club Türk Telekom. On May 2, 2016, he signed with Mega Leks for the rest of the season. On July 8, 2016, Rašić signed with Romanian club U BT Cluj-Napoca. In September 2019, Rašić announced his retirement.

National team career
As a member of the senior men's Serbian national basketball team, Rašić played at the 2010 FIBA World Championship and the EuroBasket 2011.

Career statistics

Euroleague

|-
| style="text-align:left;"| 2008–09
| style="text-align:left;"| Partizan
| 19 || 17 || 25.6 || .364 || .353 || .853 || 1.4 || 2.2 || .6 || .1 || 7.0 || 5.7
|-
| style="text-align:left;"| 2009–10
| style="text-align:left;"| Partizan
| 22 || 0 || 17.7 || .315 || .299 || .891 || 1.4 || 2.3 || .5 || .0 || 7.3 || 6.1
|-
| style="text-align:left;"| 2012–13
| style="text-align:left;"| Montepaschi
| 16 || 3 || 12.5 || .444 || .485 || 1.000 || .7 || .8 || .4 || .0 || 4.4 || 3.2
|- class="sortbottom"
| style="text-align:left;"| Career
| style="text-align:left;"|
| 57 || 20 || 17.6 || .355 || .348 || .884 || 1.2 || 1.8 || .5 || .0 || 6.3 || 5.2

See also 
 List of Serbia men's national basketball team players

References

External links

 Euroleague.net profile
 Eurobasket.com profile
 FIBA.com profile
 TBLStat.net profile

1984 births
Living people
ABA League players
Alba Berlin players
Anadolu Efes S.K. players
Basketball League of Serbia players
BC Dynamo Moscow players
BC Rytas players
CS Universitatea Cluj-Napoca (men's basketball) players
KK Borac Čačak players
KK FMP (1991–2011) players
KK Mega Basket players
KK Partizan players
Mens Sana Basket players
Point guards
Serbia men's national basketball team players
Serbian expatriate basketball people in Germany
Serbian expatriate basketball people in Italy
Serbian expatriate basketball people in Lithuania
Serbian expatriate basketball people in Romania
Serbian expatriate basketball people in Russia
Serbian expatriate basketball people in Turkey
Serbian men's basketball players
Shooting guards
Sportspeople from Šabac
TED Ankara Kolejliler players
Torku Konyaspor B.K. players
Trabzonspor B.K. players
Türk Telekom B.K. players
2010 FIBA World Championship players